Breakfast with Girls is the fourth studio album by alternative band Self, released in 1999. The album was highly anticipated, being the first Self album released on a major label since their debut album, Subliminal Plastic Motives.

Production
Working with a larger budget now that the band was on DreamWorks Records, the album featured an impressive roster of production credits, including: Richard Dodd, a Grammy-Award winning engineer; Hugh Padgham, a legendary British producer; and Ken Andrews of Failure. The sessions took place at Ocean Way Studios in Nashville, with additional tracking done at The Bennett House in Franklin, TN and Mahaffey's house in Murfreesboro, Tennessee. "Uno Song" and "Suzie Q Sailaway" were last minute additions to the album - both had originally been recorded for inclusion on Gizmodgery.

Reception

The album wasn't well-received upon release, in part due to the delays in its release, but also because of the drastic change in style from its predecessor. Rather than the more rock-oriented approach of the debut, Breakfast with Girls saw lead singer/songwriter Matt Mahaffey focusing on the more experimental sides of his music. The change confused many fans, and the critical response was mixed, with some praising him for his bold, disciplined, do-it-yourself indie aesthetic, while other critics felt the record was too cold and calculated—something that could only be enjoyed at a distance.

Despite the lukewarm reception, many of the band's fans now consider Breakfast with Girls to be Self's masterpiece, citing its quirky songwriting and diversity as reasons. It contains a wide variety of styles ranging from industrial, funk, and hip-hop to blues, jazz, and orchestral pop. The album also contains a few slightly more conventional pop/rock songs.

Release
In addition to CD, the album was also released on Vinyl with bonus tracks, and as a limited edition CD, which had a full 12 page booklet of artwork done by Brian Botcher. People who pre-ordered the album also received an EP, Brunch, and there was a vinyl release of the album, with the Brunch EP and two other songs added as bonus tracks. Both of these items are now amongst the most highly sought after Self items, though all the bonus tracks are available online as downloads. The album produced one single, the bouncy pop song "Meg Ryan", but like its parent album it didn't see much success.

The song "Paint by Numbers" was featured in the movie Dead Man on Campus and its soundtrack.

Track listing

CD

Vinyl edition

Personnel
Vocals - Matt Mahaffey
Bass, Double Bass, Harmonica, Trombone - Mac Burrus
Drums, Percussion - Jason Rawlings
Guitar, Bass, Xylophone - Mike Mahaffey
Piano, Xylophone - Chris James
Strings - The Nashville String Machine (tracks: 7, 13)
Horns - David Jellema (tracks: 11)
Saxophone - Richard Griffith (tracks: 9)
Other (Various instruments) - Matt Mahaffey

Production
Writer - Matt Mahaffey
Producer - Matt Mahaffey
Executive Producer - Richard Williams 
Mastering - Bob Ludwig
Mixing - Hugh Padgham (tracks: 1-3, 6-13), Csaba Petocz (tracks: 4), Matt Mahaffey (tracks: 5)
Engineer - Bobby Dufresne Jr., Chris James, Jeff Balding, Joe Baldridge, Ken Andrews, Matt Mahaffey, Richard Dodd, Shawn McLean
Engineer (Assistant) - Aaron Swihart, Brian Garten, Glenn Spinner, Joe Costa, John Saylor
Arranged (Strings) - Chuck Lee (tracks: 7), Chris McDonald (tracks: 13)
Engineer (Strings) - Allen Sides (tracks: 7), Shawn McLean (tracks: 13)
Co-producer - Ken Andrews (tracks: 13)

1999 albums
Self (band) albums
DreamWorks Records albums